Webb School may refer to:

Webb School (Bell Buckle, Tennessee), founded in 1870 by William R. "Sawney" Webb
Webb School of Knoxville, a private day school in Knoxville, Tennessee, founded in 1955
The Webb Schools, two private schools in Claremont, California; The Webb School of California for Boys (1922) and The Vivian Webb School for Girls (1981)
Webb School (Hancock County, Mississippi), a Mississippi Landmark

See also
Webbs Female Academy, Webbs, Kentucky, listed on the NRHP in Green County, Kentucky